Trials & Tribulations is the tenth album by the rapper Bizzy Bone. The album was released on September 11, 2007, by Real Talk Ent. The insert to this album includes advertisements for other Real Talk albums and Bone albums including Bone Brothers 2, The Best of Bizzy Bone, The Midwest Cowboy, The Story and Thug Brothers. The album shares was produced by Big Hollis, Vince V. and Hella Tight.

Track listing
"Ride to This (Intro)"
"Explain to Me"
"Let the Haters Know"
"You Don't Want It" (featuring Aeileon & King Josiah) 
"The Block"
"Don't Ask Me Why"
"Lookin the Same" (featuring Tha Realest) 
"A Thugz Prayer" 
"Distant" (featuring Aeileon El Nino) 
"I Don't Think You Know" (featuring Aeileon El Nino) 
"Mr. Coke Man" (featuring Tha Realest) 
"Still Lookin the Same" (featuring Tha Realest) 
"Don't Ask Me Why (Remix)" 
"Trust & Believe (Outro)"

2007 albums
Bizzy Bone albums
Real Talk Entertainment albums
Albums produced by Big Hollis